This is an incomplete list of Statutory Instruments of the United Kingdom in 1956. This listing is the complete, 40 items, "Partial Dataset" as listed on www.legislation.gov.uk (as at March 2014).

Statutory Instruments
The Coal Industry (Superannuation Scheme) (Winding Up, No. 10) Regulations 1956 SI 1956/248
The Airways Corporations (General Staff Pensions) (Amendment) Regulations, 1956 SI 1956/305
The Pupils' Registration Regulations 1956 SI 1956/357
The Prevention of Damage by Pests (Application to Shipping) (Amendment No. 2) Order 1956 SI 1956/420
The Sheriffs' Fees (Amendment) Order 1956 SI 1956/502 (L. 5)
The Double Taxation Relief (Taxes on Income) (Federation of Rhodesia and Nyasaland) Order 1956 SI 1956/619
The Civil Service Commission (Fees) Order 1956 SI 1956/674
The National Insurance (Modification of the London Transport and Railway Pension Schemes) Regulations 1956 SI 1956/732
The Seal Fisheries (Crown Colonies and Protectorates) (Amendment) Order in Council 1956 SI 1956/838
The Foreign Compensation Commission Rules 1956 SI 1956/962
The Double Taxation Relief (Estate Duty) (India) Order 1956 SI 1956/998
The Administration of Justice Act (Commencement) Order, 1956 SI 1956/1065
The Navy and Marines (Property of Deceased) Order 1956 SI 1956/1217
The Visiting Forces (Designation) (Colonies) (Amendment) Order, 1956 SI 1956/1368
The Mines and Quarries Act, 1954 (Commencement) Order, 1956 SI 1956/1530
The Family Allowances, National Insurance and Industrial Injuries (Refugees) Order 1956 SI 1956/1698
The Governors' Pensions (Commutation) Order 1956 SI 1956/1736
The Coal and Other Mines (General Duties and Conduct) Order 1956 SI 1956/1761
The Coal and Other Mines (Ventilation) Order 1956 SI 1956/1764
The Coal and Other Mines (Safety-Lamps and Lighting) Order 1956 SI 1956/1765
The Coal and Other Mines (Fire and Rescue) Order 1956 SI 1956/1768
The Coal Mines (Precautions against Inflammable Dust) Order 1956 SI 1956/1769
The Coal and Other Mines (Locomotives) Order 1956 SI 1956/1771
The Coal and Other Mines (Sidings) Order 1956 SI 1956/1773
The Coal and Other Mines (Sanitary Conveniences) Order 1956 SI 1956/1776
The Coal and Other Mines (Horses) Order 1956 SI 1956/1777
The Miscellaneous Mines Order 1956 SI 1956/1778
The Miscellaneous Mines (Electricity) Order 1956 SI 1956/1779
The Quarries Order 1956 SI 1956/1780
The Quarries (Electricity) Order 1956 SI 1956/1781
The Census of Distribution (1958) (Restriction on Disclosure) Order, 1956 SI 1956/1860
The Greenwich Hospital School (Regulations) (Amendment) Order, 1956 SI 1956/1894
The Merchant Shipping (Certificates of Competency as A.B.) (New Zealand) Order 1956 SI 1956/1895
The Coal Mines (Cardox and Hydrox) Regulations 1956 SI 1956/1942
The Stratified Ironstone, Shale and Fireclay Mines (Explosives) Regulations 1956 SI 1956/1943
The Mines (Manner of Search for Smoking Materials) Order 1956 SI 1956/2016
The Visiting Forces (Designation) Order 1956 SI 1956/2041
The Visiting Forces (Military Courts-Martial) (Amendment) Order 1956 SI 1956/2043
The Visiting Forces (Royal New Zealand Air Force) (Amendment) Order 1956 SI 1956/2044
The Sheriffs' Fees (Amendment No. 2) Order 1956 SI 1956/2081 (L. 24)

Unreferenced Listings
The following 11 items were previously listed on this article, however are unreferenced on the authorities site, included here for a "no loss" approach.
Police Pensions Regulations 1956 SI 1956/385
Police Pensions (Scotland) Regulations 1956 SI 1956/434
Board of Inquiry (Air Force) Rules 1956 SI 1956/579
Board of Inquiry (Army) Rules 1956 SI 1956/630
Sheffield Water Order 1956 SI 1956/1454
Sheffield Water (Charges etc.) Order 1956 SI 1956/1455
Post Office Register (Trustee Savings Banks) (Amendment) Regulations 1956 SI 1956/1670
Coal and Other Mines (Surveyors and Plans) Regulations 1956 SI 1956/1760
Coal and Other Mines (Electricity) Order 1956 SI 1956/1766
Coal and Other Mines (Steam Boilers) Order 1956 SI 1956/1772
National Library of Wales (Delivery of Books) (Amendment) Regulations 1956 SI 1956/1978

References

External links
Legislation.gov.uk delivered by the UK National Archive
UK SI's on legislation.gov.uk
UK Draft SI's on legislation.gov.uk

See also
List of Statutory Instruments of the United Kingdom

Lists of Statutory Instruments of the United Kingdom
Statutory Instruments